The 1904–05 British Home Championship was an international football tournament between the British Home Nations. It took place in the second half of the 1904–05 football season and saw England win the championship for the third time in a row with two victories and a draw. Wales, despite losing to England, came in second as part of a strong run which would result in victory at the 1907 British Home Championship. Scotland and Ireland came joint third with two points a piece.

England and Ireland kicked off the competition in February 1905 with a hard fought 1–1 draw in Middlesbrough. In early March, Wales and Scotland began their tournaments with Wales easily beating the Scots in Wrexham and taking the top of the table. Scotland responded to the defeat with a 4–0 rout of the Irish in their second game, and England then moved to the head of the table with a 3–1 victory over the Welsh at home. England then beat Scotland in London to make them winners unless Wales could win against Ireland in Belfast. In the culminating match the Welsh played hard and scored twice, but it was not enough to secure victory and the championship went to England.

Table

Results

Winning squad

References

1905 in British sport
Brit
Brit
1904
1904–05 in Scottish football
1904–05 in English football